Independence Center is a  super-regional shopping mall located in Independence, Missouri. Anchor stores are Dick's Sporting Goods and Dillard's with two vacant anchors last occupied by Macy's and Sears.

History 

The  mall opened in 1974. Its three department stores were Macy's, Sears, and Stix, Baer & Fuller's.  The mall featured a unique three-level  central atrium, with a series of ramps and stair risers traversing the expanse of open space.  In the center of the atrium, on the lowest floor, was a food court.  When it first opened and for many years afterward, the mall's advertising carried the memorable slogan "Independence Center: The "I" has it."  Independence Center even featured an enormous flashing advertising marquee which stood along I-70.  Independence Center was built by Homart, a division of Sears Roebuck & Co.  It was later acquired, owned and managed by Chicago-based LaSalle.  The mall saw its first cosmetic renovation in the mid-1980s.  Stix Baer & Fuller closed in 1982, and Dillard's occupied its space in 1984. In 1985, after Dillard's acquired Macy's Midwest stores, it sold the Independence Center location to Mercantile Stores, then the parent company of The Jones Store Co.  In 1994, Independence Center was purchased by Simon Property Group.  In 1996, the mall added a two-story carousel in the atrium; and in 1998, the mall underwent a massive $20 million renovation, which improved the property's aesthetics and vertical transportation, and also improved the food court.  Also in 1998, a large children's play area was added.  In 2004, Independence Center saw another renovation, which added small shop space on the outside of the mall facing 39th Street.  In 2006 Macy's returned to its original location in the mall after the Federated-May department stores merger, which resulted in all Kansas City area Jones Store locations being converted to Macy's stores.

In 2018, Independence Center was sold to Pacific Retail Capital Partners. 

On August 6, 2019, it was announced that Sears would be closing this location as part of a plan to close 26 stores nationwide. The store closed on October 27, 2019, at 3PM.

On August 20, 2019, the carousel on the ground floor was disassembled and removed from the mall.

On January 6, 2021, it was announced that Macy's would also be closing on March 21, 2021 as part of a plan to close 46 stores nationwide (the European Furniture Center moved in to the vacant Macy's in May, 2022), which left Dick's Sporting Goods and Dillard's as the only anchors left.

Overview

Independence Center is the second-largest mall in the KC Metro Area, behind Oak Park Mall.

With 12 million annual visitors, Independence Center has constantly been named the most visited attraction in Independence, Missouri. Department stores and other tenants earn their highest sales in the Independence area at Independence Center.

See also
 Independence Mall (disambiguation)

References

 Official Website

Shopping malls established in 1974
Shopping malls in Missouri
Buildings and structures in Independence, Missouri